Alessandrina "Sandra" Mondaini (1 September 1931 – 21 September 2010) was an Italian actress, singer, and television and radio presenter. She appeared in 30 films between 1953 and 2008. 

Born in Milan, Italy, she married actor Raimondo Vianello in 1962. Together with her husband she hosted numerous variety shows on Italian television including Tante scuse, Di nuovo tante scuse, Attenti a noi due, Sandra e Raimondo Show and Stasera niente di nuovo. Between 1988 and 2007 she had the leading role in the famous Italian sitcom, Casa Vianello. Her last work was the television film Crociera Vianello, a spin-off from Casa Vianello.

She died on 21 September 2010 in Milan at the age of 79, five months after her husband.

Filmography

 Attanasio cavallo vanesio (1953) - Soubrettina
 Laugh! Laugh! Laugh! (1954) - Innamorata litigiosa
 No, no, Nanette (1955) (TV)
 Io piaccio (1955) - The Harassing Woman at Theatre
 Motivo in maschera (1955)
 Il campanile d'oro (1955) - Rosetta
 Susanna tutta panna (1957) - Marisa Trombetti
 Le dritte (1958) - Rina Bettini
 La ragazza indiavolata (1958) (TV)
 Il gatto in cantina (1958) (TV)
 Noi siamo due evasi (1959) - Isabella
 Tom Jones (1960) (TV)
 Caccia al marito (1960) - Ilde Cavazza
 Le olimpiadi dei mariti (1960) - Sandra, Raimondo's wife
 Un mandarino per Teo (1960) - Rosanella Ferrante
 Ferragosto in bikini (1960) - La padrona della pensione Stella (voice)
 Bellezze sulla spiaggia (1961)
 Hercules in the Valley of Woe (1961)
 Scandali al mare (1961) - Alba
 Le magnifiche sette (1961) - Sergente Stefania
 La ragazza sotto il lenzuolo (1961) - Greta
 Gli italiani e le donne (1962) - Livia (segment "L'Auto-garçonniere")
 Il coraggio (1962) (TV)
 Principesse Violini e Champagne (1963) (TV)
 Il giorno più corto (1963) - Erede Siciliana (uncredited)
 Le motorizzate (1963) - The Lady Driver (segment "Un Investimento Sicuro")
 Siamo tutti pomicioni, regia di Marino Girolami (1963) - Lidia - Floro's wife (segment "Il piazzista")
 La donna degli altri è sempre più bella (1963) - La signora Parodi (segment "La natura vergine")
 I maniaci (1964) - Paolo's Wife (segment "i consigli")
 Corpse for the Lady (1964) - Marina
 Questo pazzo, pazzo mondo della canzone (1965)
 Spiaggia libera (1966) - Maria - la moglie dell'ingegnere
 Mi vedrai tornare (1966) - Moglie di Tommasso, cameriera
 Veneri in collegio (1965) - Leontine
 A... come assassino (1966)
 Due dozzine di rose scarlatte (1966) (TV)
 Chi non prova non ci crede (1968) (TV)
 Bertoldo Bertoldino e Cacasenno (1969) (TV)
 La donna di cuori (1969) (TV) - Brigitte Ansara
 Sbirulino (1982) - Sbirulino
 Casa Vianello (1988-2006) (TV) - Sandra Mondaini
 Cascina Vianello (1996) (TV) - Sandra Mondaini
 Caro maestro (1996) (TV) - Aunt Ottilia
 Caro maestro 2 (1997) (TV) - Sandra Mondaini
 I misteri di Cascina Vianello (1997) (TV) - Sandra Mondaini
 Crociera Vianello (2008) (TV) - Sandra Mondaini

References

External links

1931 births
2010 deaths
Italian women comedians
Italian film actresses
Italian television presenters
Actresses from Milan
Italian women television presenters